The 1995 Kvalserien was the 21st edition of the Kvalserien. It determined which team of the participating ones would play in the 1995–96 Elitserien season and which three teams would play in the 1995–96 Swedish Division 1 season.

Tournament

External links
Tournament on hockeyarchives.info

Kvalserien
Kval